Farmer's Reserve is an album released by experimental jazz-funk organ trio Medeski, Martin & Wood.  It consists of one 40-minute minimalist improvisation followed by a 15-minute epilogue.  It was originally only available at the band's concerts and online store.

Track listing
All tracks by Medeski Martin & Wood

"Part 1 (1)" – 4:02 
"Part 1 (2)" – 2:55 
"Part 1 (3)" – 4:23
"Part 1 (4)" – 3:46 
"Part 2 (1)" – 6:35 
"Part 2 (2)" – 3:23
"Part 2 (3)" – 2:34
"Part 2 (4)" – 7:10 
"Part 3 (1)" – 3:09
"Part 3 (2)" – 4:27
"Epilogue" – 15:12

Personnel
John Medeski – keyboards
Billy Martin – drums, percussion
Chris Wood – bass

Medeski Martin & Wood albums
Free improvisation albums
Free jazz albums
Avant-garde jazz albums
Indirecto Records albums
1997 albums